Sageraea is a genus of flowering plants in the family Annonaceae.

Species include:

References

Annonaceae
Annonaceae genera
Taxa named by Nicol Alexander Dalzell
Taxonomy articles created by Polbot